Robin Hewlett Carle (born June 1, 1955) served as the thirty-second Clerk of the U.S. House of Representatives. Carle was the first woman to hold the position.

Biography
Carle is a native of New Mexico. She attended Macalester College in Saint Paul, Minnesota.

She was executive Secretary then Chief of Staff for the Department of Health and Human Services under George H. W. Bush. She was Clerk of the U.S. House of Representatives from 1995 to 1999.

Carle joined The Century Council after leaving the U.S. House of Representatives. She became senior vice president at Fleishman-Hillard in 2004. She joined Dr. Louis W. Sullivan at the Joint Center for Political and Economic Studies in 2007. Carle is now the Executive Director and Chief Operating Officer at The Sullivan Alliance to Transform the Health Professions.

References

External links

Clerks of the United States House of Representatives
1955 births
Living people
American chief operating officers
Macalester College alumni
Women business executives